Norsborg metro station is the end station on the red line of the Stockholm metro, located in Norsborg, Botkyrka Municipality. The distance to Slussen is 20.8 km. The station was opened on 12 January 1975 as the southwestern terminus of the extension from Fittja.

The new Norsborg Depot was built immediately beside Norsborg station between 2012 and 2016, and houses the new SL C30 trains that started operations on the red line in 2020.

Arts at Norsborg metro station
"A tribute to movement" by artist Raha Rastifard is a Public art at Norsborgs metro station presented to public in 2017.

References

Red line (Stockholm metro) stations
Railway stations opened in 1975